The Elias Hand House is a historic home located at Mountainville in Orange County, New York.  It was built about 1830 and is a -story, clapboard-sided wood-frame dwelling in the Greek Revival style.  It has a side-hall plan and a low-pitched gable roof.  It features a portico with a pent roof supported by two square Doric order columns.  Also on the property is a contributing wood-frame barn.

It was listed on the National Register of Historic Places in 1998.

References

Houses on the National Register of Historic Places in New York (state)
Greek Revival houses in New York (state)
Houses completed in 1830
Houses in Orange County, New York
1830 establishments in New York (state)
National Register of Historic Places in Orange County, New York